Home Nations Championship may refer to any of following competitions competed for by representative teams from the Home Nations:

 Six Nations Championship, rugby union competition originally known as the Home Nations Championship
 British Home Championship, defunct football competition
 Skanska Amateur Four Nations, rugby league competition